Paul Jessup may refer to:

 Paul Jessup (athlete) (1908–1992), American athlete
 Paul Jessup (writer) (born 1977), American writer